The 2016–17 Tweede Divisie season was the first edition of the Dutch third tier since its initial dissolution from the 1970-71 season and the fifteenth overall using "Tweede Divisie" name. Fourteen teams were completed from the Topklasse Saturday and Sunday divisions. Seven highest-placed teams of each division earned promotion to constitute a new, amateur Tweede Divisie. This change in the league system was approved in a KNVB assembly in December 2014. Thus, the Topklasse and leagues below it decremented by one level, and furthermore, promotion and relegation between the Tweede Divisie and the Topklasse were implemented.

Teams

League standings

Relegation play-offs
See (Derde Divisie) Promotion/relegation play-offs Tweede and Derde Divisie.

Number of teams by provinces

Attendances

References

External links
Tweede Divisie at KNVB.nl 

Tweede Divisie seasons
3
Ned